Larry Campbell (born February 20, 1951) is an American politician. He had served as a Republican member for the 26th district in the Kansas House of Representatives from 1997 to 2005 and 2013 to 2018.

References

1955 births
Living people
Republican Party members of the Kansas House of Representatives
21st-century American politicians